In music, Op. 147 stands for Opus number 147. Compositions that are assigned this number include:

 Foerster – Nonet
 Schubert – Piano Sonata in B major, D 575
 Schumann – Missa sacra
 Shostakovich – Viola Sonata